Sathe is a town in Ethiopia.

Location
The town sits north of the Dawa River, directly across the international border with Rhuma, Kenya. The coordinates of the town are: 3°57'06.0"N, 41°11'30.0"E (latitude: 3.951676; longitude: 41.191668). Other towns in Liben Zone include  Softu and Dolo.

See also
List of cities and towns in Ethiopia

References

Populated places in Liben Zone
Populated places in the Somali Region